Sur is the capital city of Ash Sharqiyah South Governorate, and the former capital of Ash Sharqiyah Region in northeastern Oman, on the coast of the Gulf of Oman. Historically, the city is known for being an important destination point for sailors. Today, the sea still plays an important part of life in Sur.

Geography
Nearby villages include Dughmur and Qalhat.

History
By the 6th century, Sur was an established centre for trade with East Africa.

Ibn Battuta commented on his visit to this "roadstead of a large village on the seashore." In the 16th century, it was under Portuguese rule but was liberated by the Omani Imam Nasir ibn Murshid and underwent an economic revival, as a trade centre with India and East Africa. This continued until the mid-19th century, when the British outlawed the slave trade. The city was further ruined by the opening of the Suez Canal, which saw it lose trade with India.

Education
The main college in Sur is the Sur College of Applied Sciences. The college has over 4000 students and  offers degrees in Business, Communication, Information Technology and Design and Applied Biotechnology. It is considered one of the better institutions of higher learning in Oman. The second college is Sur University College. There is an Indian school, Indian School Sur which offers classes up to Grade 12.

Shipbuilding
It is one of the famous cities in the Persian Gulf region in building wooden ships. Its historical location gives it the hand to monitor the Gulf of Oman and the Indian Ocean. Many ships have been built in this city, like the sambuk and ghanjah. They formerly went as far as China, India, Zanzibar, Iraq and many other countries. These vessels were also used in pearl fishing.

Climate
Sur experiences a hot desert climate with very little rainfall and high temperatures. Because of its coastal location, Sur's night-time temperatures are never very low. There is no distinct wetter season, but March tends to be the wettest month, and September the driest.

Occasionally, Sur gets battered by cyclones. In 2007, Cyclone Gonu battered the city, and in 2010, Sur was hit by Cyclone Phet.

Gallery

Notable people
 Suhail Bahwan (born 1938/39), Omani billionaire businessman
 Salim Rashid Suri (circa 1910-1979), Omani musician
 Ahmed Mubarak Al-Mahaijri (born 1985), Omani footballer

See also

 List of cities in Oman

References

External links

 World66
  http://www.surcity.net
  http://www.surcity.net/en
  Sur in Oman, overview of a ship building town

 
Populated places in Oman
Populated coastal places in Oman